Our Lady of the Angels Academy is a historic Catholic school in rural Belle Prairie Township, near Little Falls, Minnesota. The school was built in 1911 and underwent expansions in 1931, 1951, and again in 1958. The academy closed in May of 1969 and was added to the National Register of Historic Places on December 28, 2005, for its significance as a local example of the national Catholic school system.

References

		
National Register of Historic Places in Morrison County, Minnesota
Religious buildings and structures completed in 1911
Defunct Catholic secondary schools in the United States
Buildings and structures in Morrison County, Minnesota